Siyambalagoda South Grama Niladhari Division is a Grama Niladhari Division of the Homagama Divisional Secretariat  of Colombo District  of Western Province, Sri Lanka .  It has Grama Niladhari Division Code 592A.

Siyambalagoda South is a surrounded by the Ambalangoda, Horathuduwa, Kudamaduwa, Rilawala, Wethara, Halpita and Siyambalagoda North  Grama Niladhari Divisions.

Demographics

Ethnicity 

The Siyambalagoda South Grama Niladhari Division has a Sinhalese majority (98.6%) . In comparison, the Homagama Divisional Secretariat (which contains the Siyambalagoda South Grama Niladhari Division) has a Sinhalese majority (98.1%)

Religion 

The Siyambalagoda South Grama Niladhari Division has a Buddhist majority (96.7%) . In comparison, the Homagama Divisional Secretariat (which contains the Siyambalagoda South Grama Niladhari Division) has a Buddhist majority (96.2%)

Grama Niladhari Divisions of Homagama Divisional Secretariat

References